Isla del Cerrito is a village and municipality of the Chaco Province in Northern Argentina, at the Argentina–Paraguay border

References

Populated places in Chaco Province